The Men's 50 metre freestyle competition of the 2014 FINA World Swimming Championships (25 m) was held on 4 December with the heats and the semifinals and 5 December with the final.

Records
Prior to the competition, the existing world and championship records were as follows.

The following records were established during the competition:

Results

Heats
The heats were held at 10:59.

Semifinals
The semifinals were held at 18:46.

Semifinal 1

Semifinal 2

Final
The final were held at 19:35.

References

Men's 50 metre freestyle